The Longwood Football Netball Club was established in 1888 and is an Australian rules football club which competes in the Kyabram DFL  since 2010.
They are based in the Victorian town of Longwood.

History

Longwood Football Club was formed in 1888 and played their first match at Longwood against a combined Castle Creek and Euroa football team in May, 1888.

Longwood joined the Kyabram DFL in 2010 after the Benalla & District Football League folded at the end of 2009.

Football Competitions Timeline
1890 - Sutherland Cup competition
1891 - 1892 - North Eastern Football Association 
From 1904 to 1949 Longwood was a part of the Euroa and District Football Association.
From 1950 to 1954 Longwood was a part of the Hume Highway Football League.
In 1955 Longwood was a part of the Waranga NE 2nd XVIII competition.
From 1956 to 1969 Longwood was a part of the Avenel-Longwood Football Club in the Waranga NE 2nd XVIII competition.
From 1970 the club reformed in its own right and played in the Benalla & District Football League. They competed in this league until it folded after the 2009 season.

Football Premierships
Seniors
 Euroa District Football Association: 
 1906, 1908, 1924, 1934, 1935, 1936
Hume Highway Football League: 
1953
Benalla & District Football League: 
1977, 1985, 2000

Runners Up
Senior Football
Euroa District Football Association
1909

Benalla & District Football League
1973, 1986, 1995, 2002

References

External links
Official Kyabram and District Football League Website